The following is a glossary of terms used in the description of lichens, composite organisms that arise from algae or cyanobacteria living among filaments of multiple fungus species in a mutualistic relationship.

Until the end of the 18th century, only a couple of lichen-specific terms had been proposed. Johann Dillenius introduced  in 1742 to describe the cup-shaped structures associated with genus Cladonia, while in 1794 Michel Adanson used  for the furrowed fruitbodies of the genus Graphis. Erik Acharius, the "father of lichenology", conceived many new terms to describe lichen structures in several of his seminal publications in the early 1800s. In 1825, Friedrich Wallroth published the first of his multi-volume work Naturgeschichte der Flechten ("Natural History of Lichens"), in which he proposed an alternative terminology based largely on roots from the Greek language. Until about 1850, there were 21 terms for features of the lichen thallus that remain in use today.

The increasing availability of the optical microscope as an aid to identifying and characterizing lichens led to the creation of new terms to describe structures that were previously too small to be visualized. Contributions were made by Julius von Flotow (e.g. ), Edmond Tulasne (e.g ), and William Nylander (e.g.). In the next five decades that followed, many other additions were made to the repertoire of lichen terms, subsequent to the increased understanding of lichen anatomy and physiology made possible by microscopy. In some cases, older terminology became obsolete as better understanding of the nature of the fungal–algal relationship led to changes in their terminology.

Terms defining features of lichens are used to describe aspects and relationships unique to lichens as composite organisms. These include terms that describe the two major components of lichens ( and ); specialized structures in lichen physiology (e.g., podetium, medulla, the ); descriptors of types of lichens (e.g.); two- and three-dimensional shapes used to describe spores and other lichen structures (e.g.); terms of position (e.g.) and shape (e.g.); prefixes and suffixes commonly used to form lichen terms; terminology used in methods for the chemical identification of lichens (e.g. various spot tests); and "everyday" words that have a specialized meaning in lichenology (e.g.). The list also includes a few historical terms that have been supplanted or are now considered obsolete (e.g.). Although no longer part of the modern lichen lexicon, knowledge of these terms helps in understanding older literature.

A

B

C

D

E

F

G

H

I

J

K

L

M

N

O

P

R

S

T

U

V

X

Z

See also
 Glossary of biology
 Glossary of mycology
 Glossary of scientific naming
 List of common names of lichen genera
 List of Latin and Greek words commonly used in systematic names

Citations

Sources

 
 
 
 
 
 
 
 
 
 
 
 
 
 
 
 
 
 
 
 
 
 
 
 
 
 
 
 
 
 
 
 
 
 
 

 
 
 
 
 
 
 
 
 
 
 
 
 
 
 

Lichens
Glossaries of biology
Wikipedia glossaries using description lists